René Haselbacher (born 15 September 1977 in Vienna) is an Austrian retired professional road bicycle racer. He won the Austrian National Road Race Championships in 2002. He left  in the summer of 2010, and retired the following year, when he moved to South Africa.

Major results

 Rheinland-Pfalz Rundfahrt (2006)
 1 stage (2003–2006)
  Road Race Champion (2002)
 PostGirot Open - 1 stage (2002)
 Dekra Open - 1 stage (1999)

References

External links 

 

Austrian male cyclists
1977 births
Living people
Cyclists from Vienna
Cyclists at the 2000 Summer Olympics
Olympic cyclists of Austria
21st-century Austrian people